Agricultural Training Centre ( – Marḵaz Emūzesj Keshāvarzī) is a village and training centre in Qeblehi Rural District, in the Central District of Dezful County, Khuzestan Province, Iran. At the 2006 census, its population was 105, in 25 families.

References 

Populated places in Dezful County